Santhormok High School is a public secondary school located on Kampuchea Krom Blvd in Khan Tuol Kouk, Phnom Penh.

The school educates students from grade 7 to 12. With 5 study buildings and 1 staff building the school is cover about 120x130 meters of land.

Sports 
Santhormok High School is rich of sport students. Due to the facility of the school such as soccer field and basketball field, santhormok high school is one of the strongest high school sport team in Cambodia.

Soccer 
Santhormok High School got its own football league which is not officially created under the school management but under the arrangement of soccer teams in Santhormok High School.

Santhormok high school football league

References

Schools in Cambodia